Pukiš is a village in the municipalities of Lopare (Republika Srpska) and Čelić, Tuzla Canton, Bosnia and Herzegovina.

Demographics 
According to the 2013 census, its population was 519, all of them living in the Lopare part, thus none in Čelić.

References

Populated places in Lopare
Populated places in Čelić